Baskarp is a minor locality situated in Habo Municipality in Jönköping County, Sweden. It had 79 inhabitants in 2010.

References

Populated places in Habo Municipality